El Tejar is a town, with a population of 15,639 (2018 census), and a municipality in the Chimaltenango department of Guatemala.

Economy

El Tejar was named for the tejas (roof tiles), bricks, and other pottery articles which are well known for their quality nationwide.

Climate

El Tejar has a subtropical highland climate (Köppen climate classification: Cwb).

See also
 
 
 List of places in Guatemala

References

Municipalities of the Chimaltenango Department